Little Bytham railway station was a station in Little Bytham, Lincolnshire on the Great Northern Railway main line. It closed in 1959. The Midland and Great Northern Joint Railway crossed just north of the station. The GNR were given powers to build a junction but never did so. The nearest station on the M&GNR was at Castle Bytham.

From 1857 to 1884, Little Bytham was the junction for the Edenham & Little Bytham Railway branch line to Edenham.  The public house now called The Willoughby Arms, but then The Steam Engine was built as the terminus, although the track crossed into the GNR goods yard for interchange purposes.

References

External links
Local web site with several sub-pages about each railway

Disused railway stations in Lincolnshire
Railway stations in Great Britain opened in 1853
Railway stations in Great Britain closed in 1959
Former Great Northern Railway stations
1853 establishments in England